Joseph Rademacher may refer to:

 Joseph Rademacher (soldier) (born 1985), United States Army staff sergeant
 Joseph Rademacher (bishop) (1840–1900), American prelate of the Roman Catholic Church